Roscoe Thompson (July 5, 1922 in Forest Park, Georgia – April 10, 1988) was a NASCAR Grand National Series driver who drove from 1948 (at the age of 26) to 1962 (at the age of 40).

Career summary
His best season was in 1950 in the NASCAR Xfinity series where he won 6 of 29 races, finished in the top 5 23 times and top 10 29 times.  In the Grand National Series out of 2033 laps, Roscoe Thompson only managed to lead 11 (less than 1%) of them. His total career earnings were $5,440 ($ when adjusted for inflation).

The most notable races that Thompson attended were the first running of the Southern 500, 1959 Daytona 500 (first on paved track) and the 1961 running of the World 600. Some of his earlier accomplishments are as follows:

 He was inducted into the Georgia Racing Hall of Fame 10/27/06.
 Peach Bowl Champion in 1950 and 1951.
 NASCAR's sportsman champ for Georgia in 1953
 Southeastern Modified champ in 1954.
 He started 7th in the 1959 Daytona 500. (First on the track).
 He was 10th in NASCAR'S first points standings in 1948.
 In 1964 he was inducted into the Museum of Speed in Daytona.

Thompson has traditionally used the #15 and #24 as his racing numbers. He also had relied on Oldsmobile engines for the majority of his career.

References

1922 births
1988 deaths
NASCAR drivers
People from Forest Park, Georgia
Sportspeople from the Atlanta metropolitan area
Racing drivers from Atlanta
Racing drivers from Georgia (U.S. state)
Deaths from emphysema